The giant spotted whiptail (Aspidoscelis stictogrammus) is a species of teiid lizard found in the United States (Arizona) and Mexico.

References

Aspidoscelis
Reptiles described in 1950
Taxa named by William Leslie Burger
Reptiles of the United States
Reptiles of Mexico